Beaumarchais was a short-lived radio programme based on the life of Pierre-Augustin Caron de Beaumarchais broadcast on BBC Radio 4 that aired from 07 November to 12 December 1996. There were six half-hour episodes:
Noblesse Oblige
Cause Celebre
Femme Fatale
Hors de Combat
Droit d'Auteur
Le Mot Juste

It starred Henry Goodman in the title role, David Calder, Ronald Pickup as King Louis XV, Ann Beach as Madame de Pompadour, Siobhan Redmond as Marie Antoinette and Stephen Thorne as Beaumarchais' father.

References 
 Lavalie, John. Beaumarchais. EpGuides. 21 Jul 2005. 29 Jul 2005  <http://epguides.com/Beaumarchais/>.

BBC Radio 4 programmes
1996 radio programme debuts